Final Justice is a 1988 Hong Kong crime film directed by Parkman Wong. The film stars Danny Lee, who also serves as the film's producer, and Stephen Chow on his film debut.

Chow won the Taiwan Golden Horse Awards for Best Supporting Actor. He would later go on to be the top superstar of Hong Kong.

Plot
District Crime Squad Sergeant Cheung Tit-chu (Danny Lee) of the Wan Chai District has been a pioneer in the area, often establishing outstanding services. However, Cheung's tough handling style, has attracted many complaints towards him. Cheung's new superior, Chief Inspector Lo Tai-wai (Ricky Wong) is dissatisfied with him, accusing him of disobeying superior orders, while also frequently clamped by Cheung.

One day, criminal Judge (Shing Fui-On) is released from prison, and leads his former associates Bull (Tommy Wong), Chicken (William Ho) and Smut (Victor Hon) to prepare a major crime spree plan. Meanwhile, car thief Boy (Stephen Chow) regards Judge as his idol and willingly serves him, but in the course of a car theft incident, he is arrested by Cheung.

Unexpectedly, Judge and his associates use the stolen car to rob an illegal underground casino, killing some customers in the process. Boy is innocently involved in the robbery case. Moreover, Lo regards Boy as an accomplice to the robbery and charges him for robbery and murder. However, Cheung believes that Boy is innocent and is determined to find new evidence to overturn the false allegations.

Cast

Awards nominations

References

External links

Final Justice at Hong Kong Cinemagic

Final Justice at LoveHKFilm

1988 films
1980s crime action films
Hong Kong crime action films
Hong Kong detective films
Police detective films
Triad films
1980s Cantonese-language films
Films set in Hong Kong
Films shot in Hong Kong
1988 directorial debut films
1980s Hong Kong films